Iran national amateur Greco-Roman wrestling athletes represents Iran in regional, continental, and world tournaments and matches sanctioned by the United World Wrestling (UWW).

Olympics

World Championships

Asian Games

Asian Championships

See also

Iranian Premier Wrestling League
List of Iran national freestyle wrestling medalists

References
  Iran Amateur Wrestling Federation
  Pars Sport
 FILA Wrestling Database
 2012 Summer Olympics
 FILA

Wrestling in Iran
Iran Greco-Roman Mens
W